Danilkovo is a rural locality (a village) in Gorod Vyazniki, Vyaznikovsky District, Vladimir Oblast, Russia. The population was 60 as of 2010.

Geography 
Danilkovo is located 15 km southeast of Vyazniki (the district's administrative centre) by road. Peski is the nearest rural locality.

References 

Rural localities in Vyaznikovsky District